Kljajević is a Serbian surname. Notable people with the surname include:

Božidar Kljajević, Serbian historian
Srđan Kljajević (born 1974), Serbian footballer
Željko Kljajević, Serbian footballer

Serbian surnames